Pavel Budský (born 3 October 1975) is a Czech baseball first basemen for the Draci Brno of Baseball Extraliga. He previously played for the Kansas City Royals organization.

He was selected for the Czech Republic national baseball team at the 1997 European Baseball Championship, 2001 European Baseball Championship, 2003 European Baseball Championship, 2005 European Baseball Championship, 2007 European Baseball Championship, 2012 Italian Baseball Week, 2009 Baseball World Cup, 2010 European Baseball Championship, 2010 Intercontinental Cup, 2012 European Baseball Championship, 2013 World Baseball Classic Qualification

References

External links

1975 births
Living people
Baseball first basemen
Baseball pitchers
Czech expatriate baseball players in the United States
Czech expatriate sportspeople in the Netherlands
Draci Brno players
Gulf Coast Royals players
Mr. Cocker HCAW players
Sportspeople from Prague
Expatriate baseball players in the Netherlands